Rauf Parekh is an Urdu lexicographer, linguist, humorist and a Pakistani newspaper columnist.

Early life and career
Born in Karachi on August 26, 1958, Parekh was educated in Karachi.  Having obtained MA and PhD degrees in Urdu from the University of Karachi, he worked for the Urdu Lughat Board or Urdu Dictionary Board, Karachi, as Chief Editor from 2003 to 2007. Farman Fatehpuri, president of the Urdu Lughat Board, said in an interview, "The Urdu Lughat Board plans to publish 22 volumes containing 300,000 words, give or take a few hundred words." He praised Rauf Parekh for bringing out two volumes of the Urdu Lughat in two years.

Urdu Lughat Board began its work in 1958, the first volume of the Urdu Lughat came out in 1967.

In 2017, Rauf Parekh taught Urdu at the University of Karachi and wrote a weekly literary column in Dawn newspaper. In addition to writing research articles, humorous essays and critical writings, he has written over 20 books. Rauf Parekh was appointed director general of National Language Promotion Department, Islamabad, in December 2020.He also writes columns in English for the newspaper DAWN.

Bibliography
Some of his books are: 
 Urdu Lughat (vol. 19, 20, 21) (Urdu Dictionary)
 Awwaleen Urdu Slang Lughat 
 Urdu Lughat Navisi (Writing Dictionary in Urdu)
 The Oxford Urdu-English Dictionary 
 Asri Adab Aur Samaji Rujhanaat 
 Allama Iqbal by Atiya Begum

Awards and recognition
 Pride of Performance Award by the President of Pakistan in 2018

References

Pakistani essayists
Linguists from Pakistan
Living people
1958 births
Pakistani columnists
Pakistani humorists
Pakistani lexicographers
Linguists of Urdu
Urdu-language humorists
University of Karachi alumni
Academic staff of the University of Karachi
Writers from Karachi
Pakistani people of Gujarati descent
Recipients of the Pride of Performance